Textile and clothing trade unions are labor unions that represent workers in the textile industry and garment industry. A partial list is as follows.

International 
IndustriALL Global Union (Switzerland)
International Trade Union Confederation (Belgium)

Africa
Southern African Clothing and Textile Workers Union (South Africa)

Asia
All India Jute Textile Workers' Federation (India)
Bengal Chatkal Mazdoor Federation (India)
Bengal Chatkal Mazdoor Union (India)
Bengal Jute Mill Workers' Union (India)
Bengal Provincial Chatkal Mazdoor Union (India)
Bunkar Mahasabha (India)
Coimbatore District Textile Workers Union (India)
Federation of Chatkal Mazdoor Unions (India)
National Committee of the Chinese Financial, Commercial, Light Industry, Textile and Tobacco Workers' Union (People's Republic of China)
National Union of Jute Workers (India)
Pondicherry Textile Labour Union (India)
Powerloom Workers Union (India)
Rashtriya Mill Mazdoor Sangh (India)

Australia
Australian Workers Union (Australia)
Clothing, Laundry and Allied Workers Union of Aotearoa (New Zealand)
Textile, Clothing and Footwear Union of Australia (Australia)
United Voice (Australia)

Europe
Community (United Kingdom)
Fédération française de la couture (France)
GMB (trade union) (United Kingdom)
United Federation of Trade Unions (Norway)
Transport and General Workers Union (United Kingdom)

North America
UNITE HERE (United States)
Workers United (United States)

 
textile and clothing trade unions